Andrew James O'Brien may refer to:
 Andrew James O'Brien, musician in the Canadian band Fortunate Ones
 Andy O'Brien (footballer)